The 1966 NCAA University Division Wrestling Championships were the 36th NCAA University Division Wrestling Championships to be held. Iowa State University in Ames, Iowa hosted the tournament at the Iowa State Armory.

Oklahoma State took home the team championship with 79 points despite having three individual champions.
Yojiro Uetake of Oklahoma State was named the Most Outstanding Wrestler and Tom Peckham of Iowa State received the Gorriaran Award.

Team results

Individual finals

References

NCAA Division I Wrestling Championship
NCAA
Wrestling competitions in the United States
NCAA University Division Wrestling Championships
NCAA University Division Wrestling Championships
NCAA University Division Wrestling Championships